Pascal Koopmann (born 10 February 1990) is a German footballer who plays for Preußen Münster II.

Club career
He made his professional debut for Preußen Münster in April 2012, as a substitute for Dennis Grote in a 4–1 defeat against 1. FC Heidenheim in the 3. Liga.

External links

1990 births
People from Steinfurt (district)
Sportspeople from Münster (region)
Footballers from North Rhine-Westphalia
Living people
German footballers
Association football midfielders
SC Preußen Münster players
3. Liga players
Oberliga (football) players